100% Colombian is the second studio album released by the band Fun Lovin' Criminals. It was released on November 17, 1998.

Track listing

On MD release (Chrysalis 7243 4 97056 8 5) track 14 exists as hidden track ("Atlantic Cab" - "hidden-in-hidden" track), but mentioned into booklet (not on cover or MD case).

Personnel
Huey Morgan - vocals (all but 14), guitar (all but 13)
Brian Leiser - keyboard (1-3, 5, 9, 11, 13, 15), bass (4, 6, 8, 10, 12-14), trumpet (2, 5, 7, 9-11)
Steve Borgovini - drums (all)
Stuart Matthewman - saxophone (1)
BB King - guitar (13)

Charts

Weekly charts

Year-end charts

References

1998 albums
Fun Lovin' Criminals albums
Virgin Records albums
Chrysalis Records albums